is a Japanese female fashion model, tarento, and professional figure skater. She earned a bachelor's degree  in literature from Hosei University. She is  represented as a tarento by the  Platinum Production talent agency.

Personal life 
On 13 October 2021, Sawayama announced her marriage on her birthday through Twitter and Instagram account.

Works

Videos

Filmography

TV programmes

Currently appearing programmes

Former appearances

Guest appearances

TV dramas

Advertisements

Radio

Internet TV
 GyaO

Bibliography

Magazines

Photo albums

Other publications

Events, stills

References

External links
 
 (31 March 2016 – ) 
 
 
 – Ameba Blog (27 April 2010 – 31 March 2016) 
Sweet Room Kira Ri-na (old blog) (9 May 2007 – 9 June 2008) 
Rina no Sweet Diary (21 Oct 2006 – 9 May 2007) 
 

Japanese female ice dancers
Japanese female models
Japanese gravure models
Weather presenters
Horipro artists
Hosei University alumni
Sportspeople from Yokohama
1988 births
Living people